The women's triathlon at the 2016 Summer Olympics took place at Fort Copacabana in Rio de Janeiro on 20 August.

A total of 55 women from 31 nations competed in the race.

The medals were presented by Marisol Casado, IOC member, Spain and Antonio Álvarez, Vice President of the International Triathlon Union.

Results

References

Women
Women's events at the 2016 Summer Olympics